The Tlacotepec meteorite is an iron meteorite classified as an IVB meteorite. It is the only meteorite of the IVB group that is an octahedrite.

The meteorite is named after Tlacotepec, Guerrero (Mexico).

See also
 Glossary of meteoritics

References

Iron meteorites
Meteorites found in Mexico